Alain Louyot (born 1948 in Nancy), is a French senior reporter and war correspondent.

Alain Louyot has been an economic and foreign policy journalist for 40 years at RMC, RFI, RTL, La Vie française, war correspondent, chief reporter at Le Point from 1972 to the enf of 1985 (Albert Londres Prize in 1985), deputy editor and then editor at L'Express (1986–2005) and editorial director of L'Expansion (until the end of 2009, prize of the best economic magazine of the year). He joined the Elan agency in 2010 as Vice President.

Alain Louyot is also the author of several books and participates in various juries: Institut d'études politiques de Paris, life member of the jury of the Albert  London Prize and vice-president of the Albert Londres Association (2010).

Bibliography 
1985: Enquête Sur Trois Secrets D'état, Jacques Derogy, Jean-Marie Pontaut, in collaboration with Alain Louyot, 
- (Prix Albert-Londres)
1989: Gosses de guerre, Éditions Robert Laffont, Paris, 1989. 245 p. , Grand Prix de l'UNICEF and Prix Vérité 1989 of the city of Le Cannet
1995: La Palestine : les enjeux de la situation actuelle, Hachette (series "Qui, quand, quoi ?"), Paris, 79 p. , 
1996: Israël : un pays pour idéal, Hachette (series "Qui, quand, quoi?"), Paris, 79 p. 
2010: Carnets de la passagère, narrative, Éditions Grasset & Fasquelle, 
2012: Histoire de l'Adoption (Editions François Bourin),

References

External links 
 Alain Louyot on L'Express
 Alain Louyot on Who's Who?
 L'Afrique du Sud veut devenir un modèle on L'Express (20 November 2013)

20th-century French journalists
21st-century French journalists
20th-century French writers
21st-century French writers
Albert Londres Prize recipients
French war correspondents
Writers from Nancy, France
1948 births
Living people